Parramatta Park may refer to:
 Parramatta Park, New South Wales, in Sydney, Australia
 Parramatta Park, Queensland, a suburb in Cairns, Australia